is a 1956 Japanese film directed by Katsuhiko Tasaka.

Cast
 Kazuo Hasegawa
 Ichikawa Raizō VIII
 Shintaro Katsu
 Kaoru Shimizudani
 Michiko Ai

References

1956 films
Daiei Film films
1950s Japanese films